Jack Gauldie,  is a Canadian pathologist, having been a Distinguished University Professor at McMaster University.

References

Year of birth missing (living people)
Living people
Canadian pathologists
Fellows of the Royal Society of Canada
Academic staff of McMaster University
Members of the Order of Canada